Chartsengrafs may refer to:
"Chartsengrafs", a song by Grandaddy from their 2000 album The Sophtware Slump
"Chartsengrafs", a song by Gigi D'Agostino from his 2001 album Il Grande Viaggio Di Gigi D'Agostino Vol. 1